Maartens is a Dutch and Afrikaans language surname. It stems from the male given name Martin – and may refer to:
Daniel Maartens (1995),  South African rugby union player
Maretha Maartens (1945), South African author
Meghan Maartens (1999),  South African water polo player

Dutch-language surnames
Afrikaans-language surnames
Surnames from given names